Pyrgulopsis arizonae, commonly known as the Apache springsnail, is a species of minute freshwater snails with an operculum, aquatic gastropod molluscs or micromolluscs in the family Hydrobiidae.

This species' natural habitat is springs.

Description
Its differentiated from other Pyrgulopsis in that its penial filament has an elongate lobe and medium length, broad filament with the penial ornament consisting of a large, superficial ventral gland often with a similar dorsal gland.

References

Molluscs of the United States
arizonae
Gastropods described in 1987